The second season of the American television series MacGyver, consisting of 22 episodes, began on September 22, 1986, and ended on May 4, 1987 and aired on the ABC network. The region 1 DVD was released on June 7, 2005.

Episodes

References

External links 
 
 

1986 American television seasons
1987 American television seasons
MacGyver (1985 TV series) seasons